Barfield is an unincorporated community in Rutherford County, Tennessee, in the United States.

History
The community may have been named for Frederick Barfield, a local landowner.

References

Unincorporated communities in Rutherford County, Tennessee
Unincorporated communities in Tennessee